The 1985–86 American Indoor Soccer Association season was the second season for the league. The only change in teams from the inaugural season was that Chicago changed its name from the Vultures to the Shoccers. Zoran Savic of Louisville won the scoring title, but Canton’s Kia Zolgharnain netted the most goals with 52. League assists leader, Don Tobin, also of Canton was voted MVP, while his coach Trevor Dawkins took home Coach of the Year honors.

Canton and Louisville finished top of the table, well ahead the rest of the league. Both swept their semifinal opponents, to again face each other in the finals. In the championship round, the Thunder proved to be no match for the Invaders and were themselves swept in three games.

League Standings

All-Star Game
On February 5 the defending champion, Canton Invaders, hosted the first ever AISA All-Star Game at the Canton Memorial Civic Center. The Invaders faced a team of all-stars from the rest of the league’s teams. This gave the hosts a distinct advantage, because unlike their opponent, they had been playing together all season. This was never more evident than in the fact that Canton scored the final seven goals of the match to pull away, 9–4. Canton forward Ian Anderson (1 goal, 2 assists) was named the game’s MVP. Additionally the league announced that Toledo would join the league next season along with three to five others teams.

All-Star selections
Head Coach: Keith Tozer, Louisville
Asst. Coach: Chris Bartels, Kalamazoo

Canton Invaders’ All-Stars
The following Canton players were also selected by their peers as all-stars, but because of the match format, played for the host team.

Match report

Playoffs

League Leaders

Scoring

Goalkeeping

League awards
Most Valuable Player: Don Tobin, Canton 
Coach of the Year: Trevor Dawkins, Canton 
Defender of the Year: Oscar Pisano, Canton 
Goalkeeper of the Year: Victor Petroni, Kalamazoo 
Rookie of the Year: Jamie Swanner, Canton

All-AISA Teams

References

External links
Major Indoor Soccer League II (RSSSF)
1986 in American Soccer

1985 in American soccer leagues
1986 in American soccer leagues
1985-86